Alfred Vincent Covello (born February 4, 1933) is a senior United States district judge of the United States District Court for the District of Connecticut.

Education and career

Covello was born in Hartford, Connecticut. He received an Artium Baccalaureus degree from Harvard University in 1954, and then a Bachelor of Laws and a Juris Doctor from the University of Connecticut School of Law in 1960. He was in the United States Army Personnel Specialist from 1955 to 1959. He was in private practice of law in Hartford from 1960 to 1974. Covello became a member of the Charter Revision Commission in West Hartford in 1964. He was counsel to this same commission in 1966 and from 1969 to 1970. He was also counsel to the Office of Corporation Counsel in West Hartford from 1964 to 1967.

State judicial service

Covello served as judge in a number of courts beginning in the 1970s. He was a judge on the Circuit Court for the State of Connecticut from 1974 to 1975, then to Connecticut's Court of Common Pleas from 1975 to 1978. He was a judge on the Superior Court of Connecticut from 1978 to 1992, and a judge on the Appellate Session of the Superior Court from 1980 to 1983. He was a justice of the Supreme Court of Connecticut from 1987 to 1992, and an administrative judge on the Appellate System in 1992.

Federal judicial service

Covello was nominated to the United States District Court for the District of Connecticut by President George H. W. Bush on April 1, 1992, to a new seat created by 104 Stat. 5089. He was confirmed by the United States Senate on August 12, 1992, and received commission on August 17, 1992. He became chief judge in 1998, serving that status until he assumed senior status on February 4, 2003.

References

External links
 

1933 births
Living people
Lawyers from Hartford, Connecticut
Loomis Chaffee School alumni
Harvard University alumni
University of Connecticut School of Law alumni
Connecticut state court judges
Judges of the United States District Court for the District of Connecticut
United States district court judges appointed by George H. W. Bush
20th-century American judges
United States Army soldiers
Justices of the Connecticut Supreme Court
21st-century American judges